The Ulu Tutong Dam is an embankment dam on the Sungai Tutong River in Tutong District, Brunei. The primary purpose of the dam is to increase water supply in Tutong and Brunei-Muara Districts by as much as  annually. In February 2010 Sinohydro won the bid to construct the US$63 million project and construction began soon thereafter. It was originally expected to be complete in February 2014 but the date was pushed to February 2015 due to difficulties at the construction site. It was eventually fully completed in February 2017. In July 2018, it was officially renamed Ulu Tutong Golden Jubilee Dam by Sultan Hassanal Bolkiah. The dam is owned by the Public Works Department of Brunei.

See also
Benutan Dam

References

Dams in Brunei
Tutong District